Waldhof is a hamlet in the commune of Niederanven, in central Luxembourg.  , the hamlet has a population of 2 inhabitants.  It is located in the heart of the Grünewald forest, in which it is the only settlement.

Near Waldhof is the intersection between the A7 motorway and the Route d'Echternach (part of the E29 European route).

It is the location of a Luxembourg Army munitions depot.

References
  

Niederanven
Villages in Luxembourg